Andrew Alexander  is an English actor and singer, who is best known for his role as Sir John Bullock in Downton Abbey.

In 2018, he was made an Associate of the Royal Academy of Music for his significant contribution to the creative industries.

He is currently training to be an entertainment lawyer at the entertainment law firm Clintons.

Early life
Alexander attended Bradfield College, receiving academic and music scholarships. He went on to read History at King's College London before training in Musical Theatre at the Royal Academy of Music.

Career

Theatre
At 29 he played the lead role, Richard Hannay, in The 39 Steps in London's West End, having understudied the role previously. He was the first understudy to be promoted in the production due to favourable reviews and notices, including from Stephen Fry on Twitter. Other credits include The Hot Mikado at The Watermill (nominated for a TMA award) and Trouble in Mind at The Print Room (nominated for Offie and UK Theatre Awards).

Film and TV

Singing and music
He was an original member of the Sony BMG group Teatro. Teatro's first album was certified Gold in the UK. Performances included headlining at the Royal Variety Performance, meeting the Queen, and supporting José Carreras at the BBC Proms In The Park in Hyde Park.

Discography

Studio albums

Personal life
Alexander currently lives in West London with his wife, artist Araxie Kutchukian.

References

Living people
Year of birth missing (living people)
English male stage actors
English male film actors
English male television actors
Alumni of King's College London
Alumni of the Royal Academy of Music